Gaston Ducayla (31 August 1898 – 17 April 1986) was a French wrestler. He competed in the freestyle bantamweight event at the 1924 Summer Olympics.

References

External links
 

1898 births
1986 deaths
Olympic wrestlers of France
Wrestlers at the 1924 Summer Olympics
French male sport wrestlers
Sportspeople from Paris